The following is a list of games ordered vacated or forfeited by the National Collegiate Athletic Association (NCAA) in college basketball.  The list does not include forfeits imposed by individual conferences.

As a private association, the NCAA only changes its own records to reflect forfeits or vacations that its own Committee on Infractions has ordered, and not for sanctions imposed by individual conferences.

Most games vacated and forfeited
In some cases, NCAA sanctions covered multiple years.  The incidents resulting in the largest number of vacated and/or forfeited games are as follows, with all schools involved being Division I and all teams involved being men's teams unless otherwise indicated:
 Northern Colorado: 153 games (151 regular-season, 2 postseason) vacated, covering all results from 2010 to 2015.
 Louisville: 123 regular-season and tournament wins and 3 tournament losses vacated, covering four seasons (2011–2015). This includes the Cardinals' 2012 Final Four appearance and 2013 national title, making them the first Division I basketball program of either sex forced to vacate a national title. See 2015 University of Louisville basketball sex scandal.
 Stephen F. Austin: 117 regular season and tournament wins from 2014 to 2019 due to an administrative error in certifying eligibility for student-athletes.
 Michigan: 113 regular season and tournament wins and 4 tournament losses vacated covering six of eight seasons between 1992 and 1999.  See University of Michigan basketball scandal (also ).
 Southern, women: 109 wins vacated, covering all results from 2009 to 2015. 
 Syracuse: 106 regular season wins from 2004 to 2007 and 2010 to 2012. See Syracuse University athletics scandal.
 Ohio State: 82 regular season and tournament wins and 31 regular season and tournament losses vacated covering four seasons from 1999 to 2002. See Jim O'Brien and NCAA Violations.
 Arizona: 69 regular and tournament season wins and 1 tournament loss vacated from the 2007–08, 2016–17 and 2017–18 season.
 Saginaw Valley State, men (D-II): 65 regular-season wins and 4 NCAA tournament wins vacated, covering four seasons from 2014 to 2018.
 Fresno State: 49 regular season wins and 1 tournament loss vacated covering three seasons from 1999 to 2001.  See Tarkanian and the NCAA.
 BYU: 42 regular-season wins, 3 NIT wins, and 2 NIT losses vacated, covering the 2015–16 and 2016–17 seasons.
 St. John's: 46 regular season wins and 1 tournament loss vacated covering four seasons from 2001 to 2004.
 Siena: Vacated 46 wins from 2015 to 2018 seasons.
 New Mexico State: 40 regular season and tournament wins and 24 regular season and tournament losses vacated covering 5 seasons 1992–1994 and 1997–1998.
 Memphis: 38 regular season and tournament wins vacated from the 2008 season.  See John Calipari era.
 Hawaii: 36 regular-season wins vacated covering the 2012–13 and 2013–14 seasons.
 Thomas More, women (D-III): 27 regular-season and 6 NCAA tournament wins, including the national championship, from the 2014–15 season.
 FIU: 32 regular season wins vacated covering four seasons from 2003 to 2006.
 Louisiana-Lafayette: 31 wins and 2 tournament losses vacated from the 2004 and 2005 seasons. See Major violations.
 California: 28 regular season wins forfeited and 1 regular season loss vacated from the 1995 and 1996 season.
 Georgia Southern: Vacated 27 regular season wins from the 2008 and 2009 seasons.
 Minnesota: 24 regular season wins forfeited from the 1977 season.  
 Saginaw Valley State, women (D-II): 23 regular-season wins vacated, covering the 2013–14 and 2014–15 seasons.
 Florida State, men: Vacated 20 regular-season and 2 NIT wins from the 2006–07 season.
 Florida State, women: Vacated 20 regular-season and 2 NCAA tournament wins from the 2006–07 and 2007–08 seasons.
 USC: 21 regular season wins and 1 tournament loss vacated from the 2008 season.  See University of Southern California athletics scandal.
 Purdue: 19 regular season and tournament wins and 1 tournament loss vacated from the 1996 season.
In addition to vacating and forfeiting games, the NCAA has the power to issue other forms of sanctions.  The harshest sanction is a ban on a school's competing in a sport for at least one year. Sometimes referred to as the NCAA's death penalty, this sanction has been imposed twice against college basketball programs: (1) the Kentucky Wildcats men's basketball program for the 1952–53 season; and (2) the Louisiana Ragin' Cajuns men's basketball program (then known as the University of Southwestern Louisiana) for the 1973–74 and 1974–75 seasons.

Vacated and forfeited games
Unless indicated otherwise, teams listed here are men's teams, and the following information is from Sports-Reference.

See also
Death penalty (NCAA)

References

College basketball controversies in the United States